Eretmopteryx is a genus of moths of the family Crambidae. It contains only one species, Eretmopteryx flabelligera, which is found in Madagascar.

References

Pyraustinae
Monotypic moth genera
Taxa named by Max Saalmüller
Moths of Madagascar
Crambidae genera